Lanao del Sur's 1st congressional district is a congressional district in the province of Lanao del Sur that has been represented in the House of Representatives of the Philippines since 1987. It covers the eastern interior municipalities bordering the provinces of Bukidnon and Cotabato as well as those along the northern shores of Lake Lanao including its capital city, Marawi. The district is currently represented in the 19th Congress by Ziaur-Rahman A. Adiong of Lakas-CMD.

Representation history

Election results

2019

2016

2013

2010

See also
Legislative districts of Lanao del Sur

References

Congressional districts of the Philippines
Politics of Lanao del Sur
1987 establishments in the Philippines
Congressional districts of Bangsamoro
Constituencies established in 1987